Arthur D. Levinson (born March 31, 1950) is an American businessman and is the current chairman of Apple Inc. (2011–present) and CEO of Calico (an Alphabet Inc. venture). He is the former chief executive officer (1995–2009) and chairman (1999–2014) of Genentech.

In addition to serving on the board of Apple Inc. (2000–present), Levinson serves on the board of directors of the Broad Institute (affiliated with MIT and Harvard). Previously, Levinson had served on the board of directors at F. Hoffmann-La Roche (2010–2014), NGM Biopharmaceuticals (2009–2014), and Amyris Biotechnologies (2009–2014). He currently serves on the Board of Scientific Consultants of the Memorial Sloan Kettering Cancer Center, the Industrial Advisory Board of the California Institute for Quantitative Biosciences (QB3), the advisory council for the Princeton University Department of Molecular Biology and the advisory council for the Lewis-Sigler Institute for Integrative Genomics.

Early life and education
Born to a Jewish family, the son of Malvina and Sol Levinson, he received his bachelor's degree from the University of Washington in Seattle in 1972 and his PhD in biochemistry from Princeton University in 1977.

Career 
Levinson was a postdoctoral researcher with Nobel Prize winners Michael Bishop and Harold Varmus in the department of microbiology at the University of California, San Francisco, when Herb Boyer hired him to work at Genentech. Levinson joined Genentech in 1980 as a research scientist and became vice president of research technology in 1989; vice president of research in 1990; senior vice president of research in 1992; and senior vice president of research and development in 1993. Levinson became Genentech's chief executive officer in 1995 and chairman in 1999. Levinson received corporate leadership awards from the Irvington Institute and the National Breast Cancer Coalition in 1999.

Levinson was inducted into the Biotech Hall of Fame at the 2003 Biotech Meeting of CEOs. BusinessWeek named Levinson one of the "Best Managers of the Year" in 2004 and 2005, and Institutional Investor named him "America's Best CEO" in the biotech category four years in a row (2004–2007). Levinson served on the board of directors of Google from 2004 to 2009.

In 2006, Princeton University awarded Levinson the James Madison Medal for a distinguished career in scientific research and in biotechnology. Also in 2006, Barron's recognized Levinson as one of "The World's Most Respected CEOs", and  Louis Carter, CEO and founder of Best Practice Institute placed Levinson on its "25 Top CEOs" list upon approval of his Senior Executive Board. In 2008 Levinson was elected as a Fellow to the American Academy of Arts and Sciences and Glassdoor rated him as the "nicest" CEO of 2008 with a 93% approval rating.

In 2010, Levinson was honored with the Biotechnology Heritage Award from the Biotechnology Industry Organization (BIO) and the Chemical Heritage Foundation, and the Director's Award from the San Francisco Exploratorium.

Levinson has authored or co-authored more than 80 scientific articles and has been a named inventor on 11 United States patents.

On November 15, 2011, Levinson was named chairman of the board for Apple Inc., replacing Steve Jobs.

On September 18, 2013, Levinson was named CEO of Calico, a new company focusing on health and well-being. The company was created and funded by Google.

In 2014 he received the Alumnus Summa Laude Dignatus Award from the University of Washington, the highest honor bestowed upon a Washington graduate.

On October 3, 2014, Levinson received the National Medal of Technology and Innovation, the nation's highest honor for achievement and leadership in advancing the fields of science and technology.

In April 2016, Levinson was awarded the 2016 Distinguished Alumnus Award from the University of California, San Francisco for his contributions to the scientific community.

As of May 2021, he owns approximately 4.5 million Apple shares worth US$786 million.

In 2020 he received the Bower Award for Business Leadership of the Franklin Institute.

Personal life 
He married Rita May Liff on December 17, 1978, they have two children and residing in Seattle area. His son, Jesse Levinson, is currently CTO of Zoox.

See also
Breakthrough Prize in Life Sciences

References

1950 births
American computer businesspeople
Businesspeople in the pharmaceutical industry
Directors of Apple Inc.
Businesspeople from Seattle
Princeton University alumni
University of Washington alumni
Life extensionists
Biogerontologists
Living people
20th-century American Jews
Genentech people
American technology chief executives
American chairpersons of corporations
Alphabet Inc. people
University of California, San Francisco alumni
American transhumanists
21st-century American Jews